Kiskeam GAA is a Gaelic Athletic Association club based in the village of Kiskeam in the northwest of County Cork, Ireland which is in the parish of Boherbue. The club plays Gaelic football in the Duhallow division of Cork GAA and their first team competes in the Cork Senior A Football Championship.

Honours
 Cork Premier Intermediate Football Championship (1): 2016
 Cork Junior Football Championship (2): 1964, 2002  (Runners-Up 1994, 1997, 2000)
 Munster Junior Club Football Championship (0): Runners-up 2002
 Duhallow Junior A Football Championship (7): 1964, 1994, 1996, 1997, 1999, 2000, 2002
 Senior Football league Division 2 (1): 2011
 Cork Minor A Football Championship (1): 2010
 Duhallow Under-21 B Football Championship (1): 2016
 North Cork Minor B Football Championship (1): 2013
 North Cork Minor B Football League (1): 2013
Duhallow Cup (1): 2021

References

External links
 Kiskeam GAA Official Website

Gaelic games clubs in County Cork
Gaelic football clubs in County Cork